Apocalypse was a  freefall tower ride that operated at Drayton Manor Resort, England from 27 May 2000 until 30 October 2022.

History

Apocalypse opened in April 2000 and had four towers: towers 1 and 2 were sit-down, while towers 3 and 4 were stand-up. In 2002, the ride was partially rebuilt to accommodate a 5th tower to use as the world's first stand-up floorless element, and was also dubbed as the fifth element. In 2016, tower five was closed until 2018 when owners removed the outside queue line and the Entrance Arch to bring in a crane to fix it. In 2019, the station area was refurbished which includes new control panels, removal of the klaxons and beacons and replaced with a siren and new flooring was put in. It was the tallest ride at the park and the only ride that could be seen outside the park and in parts the Wilnecote area of Tamworth.

Apocalypse was the first stand-up tower drop in the world and it kept the title as the only one until 2005 when Hurakan Condor opened in PortAventura Park. 

Riders reached , falling  in 4 seconds.

In 2008 the ride received an Airtime Award from amusement park fansite CoasterForce.com, whose members voted it the "Best Thrill Ride in Europe".

Starting in 2019, the towers each started closing, until only tower 2 was left in operation for most of the 2022 season. Despite efforts to get the other towers running, it was too expensive to fix the ride, and with only one tower running, the throughput was very low. Apocalypse was retired on 30 October 2022 for future park developments. The park’s social media team hosted a group photo with fans in front of the ride’s entrance on the closing day, when commemorative t-shirts were also sold in memory of the attraction.

Ride removal began on 1 November 2022, and the ride was fully dismantled across that month.

Incidents
 Two days before its launch, an electrician who was working on the tower at night, fell 30 ft from the top onto a safety hatch. He sustained a broken back and leg and the entire incident was reconstructed for BBCs 999.

References

2000 establishments in England
Drop tower rides
Amusement rides manufactured by Intamin
Amusement rides introduced in 2000